Rutger van Schaardenburg (born 8 October 1987, in Alkmaar) is a sailor from the Netherlands, who represented his country for the first time at the 2008 Summer Olympics in Qingdao. There he took the 34th place in the Laser class. Van Schaardenburg's second Olympic appearance was during the 2012 Olympics in Weymouth. In this competition Van Schaardenburg took 14th place.  He competed again in the laser class at the 2016 Olympics, finishing in 9th place.

Further reading

2008 Olympics (Qingdao)

2012 Olympics (Weymouth)

References

Living people
1987 births
Sportspeople from Alkmaar
Dutch male sailors (sport)
Sailors at the 2008 Summer Olympics – Laser
Sailors at the 2012 Summer Olympics – Laser
Olympic sailors of the Netherlands
Sailors at the 2016 Summer Olympics – Laser
21st-century Dutch people